The 2010 Primera B de Chile was second tier's 60th season. Deportes Iquique was the tournament's champion, winning its third title.

Aggregated table

Promotion Playoffs

Top goalscorers

References

External links
RSSSF Chile 2010

Primera B de Chile seasons
Chil
2010 in Chilean football